The Vassal Engine is a game engine for building and playing online adaptations of board games, tabletop games and card games. It allows users to play in real time over a live Internet connection, and also by email (PbeM). It runs on all platforms, and is free, open-source software. For example, there is a Star Wars Miniatures module, where players can play with up to three others in a digital replica of the table-top game.

It is written in Java and the source code is available from GitHub under the LGPL open source license.

History 
Vassal began as VASL (Virtual Advanced Squad Leader), an application for playing Advanced Squad Leader.

Available modules 
Vassal modules exist for over 1000 games, some of which are listed here. A more comprehensive, but not exhaustive, list of modules exists on the Vassal module site list.

Tabletops 
 Star Wars: X-Wing Miniatures Game  Presently the most commonly played Vassal module, with over 30% of total traffic.
 V40k, a Warhammer 40,000 module. 
 Star Wars: Armada
 Warmachine and Hordes
 Malifaux
 Battlefleet Gothic
 Star Wars Miniatures

Boardgames 
 Advanced Squad Leader (VASL)
 Twilight Struggle
 Monopoly
 Diplomacy
 HeroQuest
 Pandemic
 Space Hulk
 Shadows over Camelot
 Memoir 44
 Victory in the Pacific
 World in Flames
 Gloomhaven

Card games 
 Playing Cards
 Bridge/Hearts
 Up Front

Copyright and licensing
In September 2008, Games Workshop issued a cease-and-desist order regarding V40k to Tim Davis, the V40k module maintainer at that time. The module is still played.

Games Workshop has also issued a cease-and-desist order regarding Space Hulk.

Similar projects

Similar engines for making board games include ZunTzu and Boardgame.io.

References

External links

 Official Vassal website
 GitHub page for the engine

2002 software
Free game engines
Free software projects
Free software programmed in Java (programming language)